Morning report may refer to:

 Morning report (medicine) - a daily meeting of hospital doctors
 Morning report (United States military), a daily list of personnel not presented and accounted for
 Morning Report, a radio programme on RNZ National in New Zealand
 A song in the musical The Lion King
 An album by Canadian artist Arkells